Potomac Park is an unincorporated subdivision and census-designated place (CDP) located on the North Branch Potomac River in Allegany County, Maryland, United States. As of the 2010 census, it had a population of 2,530. Potomac Park lies along U.S. Route 220 (McMullen Highway) between Cresaptown and Cumberland. The CDP of Bowling Green is immediately to the north on Route 220.

Within the boundaries of the community are the Allegany County Fairgrounds and the Western Correctional Institution.

Demographics

References

Census-designated places in Allegany County, Maryland
Census-designated places in Maryland
Populated places in the Cumberland, MD-WV MSA
Cumberland, MD-WV MSA
Populated places on the North Branch Potomac River